Richard Marshall Bagley Sr. (May 14, 1927 – December 13, 2001) was an American politician who served for two decades as a member of the Virginia House of Delegates. He announced a run for governor in the 1985 election but dropped out before the Democratic primary, which was eventually won by Gerald Baliles. He then sought the chairmanship of the Democratic Party of Virginia but stepped aside to allow Dick Davis to take the position.

References

External links
 
 

1927 births
2001 deaths
Democratic Party members of the Virginia House of Delegates
State cabinet secretaries of Virginia
Virginia Tech alumni
20th-century American politicians